We Got Love is the fifteenth studio album by European-American pop group The Kelly Family. It was released by license to Airforce1 Records, a division of Universal Music, on March 24, 2017 throughout most of Central Europe.

This is the comeback album, released 13 years after the previous one and the band's breakup. The album contains remakes of old hits and the new material.

Track listing

Charts

Weekly charts

Year-end charts

Decade-end charts

Certifications

References

External links
 KellyFamily.de — official site

2017 albums
The Kelly Family albums